Nobody's Child is a 1986 American made-for-television drama film directed by Lee Grant which won a Directors Guild of America Award. It is based on the autobiographical account of the same title by Marie Balter who was sent to a mental institution aged sixteen, with a  script adapted by writers Mary Gallagher and Ara Watson. The cast includes Marlo Thomas, Ray Baker, Caroline Kava and Anna Maria Horsford.

At the 38th Primetime Emmy Awards, Marlo Thomas was awarded the Outstanding Lead Actress in a Miniseries or Special for her role as Marie Boulter in this film.

References

External links
 

1986 television films
1986 films
1986 drama films
CBS network films
Films about child abuse
Films directed by Lee Grant
Films scored by Michael Small
American drama television films
1980s American films